Flight 404 may refer to:

 Japan Airlines Flight 404, which was hijacked by a group of 5 terrorists on 20 July 1973, led by Osamu Maruoka
 Pakistan International Airlines Flight 404, which was thought to have been crashed somewhere in the Himalayas on 25 August 1985; however, no wreckage was found
 Alitalia Flight 404, which crashed into Stadlerberg Mountain on 14 November 1990, due to an argument over whether to go-around between the Captain and First Officer and due to NAV and GPWS failures

0404